Fredericton-Fort Nashwaak was a provincial electoral district for the Legislative Assembly of New Brunswick, Canada. It was first created in the 2006 redrawing of electoral districts and was first used in the general election later that year.  Its last MLA was Pam Lynch of the Progressive Conservative Party of New Brunswick.

History 

The district was created in the 2006 redistribution although, somewhat confusingly, a district by the same name existed immediately prior to this.  The district combined those portions of the old Fredericton-Fort Nashwaak district north of the Saint John River with approximately half of the Fredericton North district (those portions east of the Westmorland Street Bridge) with suburban areas from the old riding of Grand Lake as well as a large part of unpopulated territory also from Grand Lake.

Members of the Legislative Assembly

Election results 

* This was a new district being contested for the first time, being made up in parts from the former districts of Fredericton-Fort Nashwaak, Fredericton North and Grand Lake.  All three of these districts were previously held by the Liberals and Kelly Lamrock, the Liberal candidate, was the incumbent from the former district of Fredericton-Fort Nashwaak.

See also 
 New Brunswick electoral redistribution, 2006
 Fredericton-Fort Nashwaak (1995–2006)

References 

 "An Electoral Map for New Brunswick: Final Report of the Electoral Boundaries and Representation Commission"
 Office of the Chief Electoral Officer.  "2006 Provincial Election Results"

External links 
Website of the Legislative Assembly of New Brunswick

Former provincial electoral districts of New Brunswick
Politics of Fredericton